Paul Turner (born 13 February 1960) is a former Wales international rugby union player and the former head coach of Welsh regional side Newport Gwent Dragons.

Playing career 
Turner was born in Newbridge, and still holds the Newbridge points scoring record of 405 points from season 1983–84 and still remains the only back capped from Newbridge RFC. An outside-half, he was a prolific goal-kicker and is the joint record points holder for Newport RFC.

He also played for Pontypool, Newbridge, Bedford and Sale FC.  He represented Wales on 3 occasions and played for the Barbarians invitational side three times.

Turner represented the Crawshays and the Penguins at the Hong Kong Sevens in 1985, 87 and 88 respectively.

Coaching career 

Turner left Newport RFC and became player/coach at Sale FC in 1992, leaving in 1996 to join Bedford RFC as player/Head Coach, taking both clubs into the English Premiership during his tenure.  In 1998/99 he joined Saracens as backs coach and then spent 2 seasons at Rugby Lions as player/coach, winning promotion to Division 1.  In 2001 he left Rugby Lions to work under Philippe Saint-André at Gloucester, winning the inaugural Premiership Grand Final.  He moved on to Harlequins as backs coach from 2002 to 2005. In 2005 he was appointed head coach for the Newport Gwent Dragons and he stepped down in February 2011. He was Magners league coach of the year for the 2010 season. In July 2011 he was appointed attack and skills coach at Wasps He is currently Head Coach at National 1 side Ampthill RFC.

Other interests 
Turner founded his own rugby consultancy business "Paul Turner Rugby" in April 2012 and worked as a rugby consultant on the grassroots rugby programme "Inside Welsh Rugby". In 2014, he rebranded the company as "Paul Turner Sport", offering additional services to complement his coaching.

References

External links
Newport Gwent Dragons profile
Welsh Rugby Union profile
ESPN Rugby Union Profile

1960 births
Living people
Bedford Blues players
Crumlin RFC players
Dragons RFC coaches
Newbridge RFC players
Newport RFC players
Pontypool RFC players
Rugby union players from Newbridge, Caerphilly
Sale Sharks players
Wales international rugby union players
Welsh rugby union coaches
Welsh rugby union players